Palpopleura jucunda, commonly known as the Yellow-veined widow, is a species of dragonfly in the family Libellulidae, which is native to sub-Saharan Africa.

Range and habitat
It is found in Angola, Botswana, the DRC, Ivory Coast, Ethiopia, Kenya, Malawi, Mozambique, Namibia, Nigeria, South Africa, Sudan, Tanzania, Uganda, Zambia, Zimbabwe, and possibly Burundi. Its natural habitats are swamps and intermittent freshwater marshes.

References

Libellulidae
Taxonomy articles created by Polbot
Insects described in 1842